Andrus Villem (born 21 March 1959 Kose) is an Estonian philologist and politician. He was a member of VII Riigikogu.

References

Living people
1959 births
Estonian philologists
Members of the Riigikogu, 1992–1995